Marcelo Marmelo da Silva (born August 1, 1972) is a Brazilian former footballer who played as a striker. He is one of the most famous player in Chinese former top league Jia A.

Marmelo scored a superb solo goal which was scored one of the greatest goal in Chinese professional league history, in a game against Shanghai Shenhua.

Marmelo is living in Chengdu after he retired. His wife is a Russian and has a son.

References

External links
 Brazilian FA database

1972 births
Living people
Brazilian footballers
Brazilian expatriate sportspeople in China
Guangzhou F.C. players
Expatriate footballers in China
Association football forwards